Vojin of Gacko or Vojvoda Vojin (fl. 1322–1347) was a Serbian magnate (velikaš) and voivode (military commander equivalent to duke), who was holding the area around Gacko, which was part of Hum, ca.1322-1347. He was in service of King Stephen Uroš III Dečanski (r. 1322–1331) and Emperor Stephen Dušan the Mighty (r. 1331-1355). He is described as one of the most important nobles (velmoža) of King Stephen, and when the King and his son Dušan entered a succession war, Vojin supported the son. Vojin plundered Dubrovnik in August 1325, and took part in the Battle of Velbazhd (1330), and the southern military campaigns of the Serbian Empire.

Vojin is the eponymous founder of the Vojinović noble family, which eventually became one of the most powerful families as provincial lords during the fall of the Serbian Empire. His sons Altoman and Vojislav were recognized as overlords of the Hum region. His daughter Vojislava married nobleman Brajko Branivojević.

Family
Miloš, mentioned as stavilac in 1333, died young
Altoman (d. 1359), veliki župan, married Ratoslava Mladenović (Branković)
Vojislav (d. 25.10.1363), veliki knez
Vojislava (also Voisava or Sela), married Brajko Branivojević

Notes

References

Sources

Grupa autora, „Rodoslovne tablice i grbovi srpskih dinastija i vlastele (prema tablicama Alekse Ivića)“ (drugo znatno dopunjeno i prošireno izdanje), Beograd, 1991. 
 John V.A. Fine. (1994). The Late Medieval Balkans: A Critical Survey from the Late Twelfth Century to the Ottoman Conquest. The University of Michigan Press. 
 George C. Soulis, The Serbs and Byzantium during the reign of Emperor Stephen Dusan (1331-1355) and his successors, Athens, 1995. 
Rade Mihaljčić, „Kraj srpskog carstva“, Beograd, 1975.

14th-century Serbian nobility
Generals of Stefan Dušan
People of the Kingdom of Serbia (medieval)
People of the Serbian Empire
Vojin
Year of birth uncertain
Medieval Serbian magnates
Boyars of Stefan Dušan